The Nigeria Union of Local Government Employees (NULGE) is a trade union representing municipal workers in Nigeria.

The union was founded in 1978, when the Government of Nigeria merged the following unions:

 Amalgamated Union of County and District Council Labourers of Nigeria
 L. C. C. Mechanical, Clerical and Allied Workers' Union
 Municipal and Local Authorities Workers' Union of Nigeria
 Mushin Town Council Workers' Union
 Nigeria Motor Drivers' Union
 Nigerian Union of Local Authority Staff
 Rivers State Municipal and Local Council Workers' Union
 Sanitary Workers' Union of Nigeria
 Town Planning Authorities Staff Union of Western State of Nigeria
 Western State Conservancy Workers' Union
 Western State Wastes Disposal Employees' Union

The union affiliated to the Nigeria Labour Congress.  It had 245,000 members by 1995.

References

Municipal workers' trade unions
Trade unions established in 1978
Trade unions in Nigeria